Morotripta is a genus of moths of the family Autostichidae. It was formerly placed in the Yponomeutidae.

Species
Morotripta argillacea Mey, 2011
Morotripta fatigata Meyrick, 1917

References

Symmocinae